Farès Ferjani (born 22 July 1997) is a Tunisian fencer. He competed in the men's sabre event at the 2016 Summer Olympics.

He competes for St. John’s University. He qualified to represent Tunisia at the 2020 Summer Olympics.

References

External links
 

1997 births
Living people
Tunisian male sabre fencers
Olympic fencers of Tunisia
Fencers at the 2016 Summer Olympics
Fencers at the 2020 Summer Olympics
Sportspeople from Tunis
Fencers at the 2014 Summer Youth Olympics
African Games gold medalists for Tunisia
African Games medalists in fencing
Competitors at the 2015 African Games
Competitors at the 2019 African Games
21st-century Tunisian people
Competitors at the 2022 Mediterranean Games
Mediterranean Games competitors for Tunisia